Forever Tonight may refer to:
 "Forever Tonight" by Galantis, from the album Pharmacy
 "Forever Tonight" by Jan Hammer
 "Forever Tonight" by Pantera, from the album I Am the Night
 "(I Wanna Take) Forever Tonight" by Peter Cetera, from the album One Clear Voice